Eva Herzigová (born 10 March 1973) is a Czech model and actress.

Early life and career
Herzigová was born in Litvínov, Czechoslovakia (now Czech Republic), the daughter of an accountant mother and an electrician father. Growing up, Herzigová was athletic, "excelling in gymnastics, basketball, track and cross-country skiing." She began her modeling career after winning a modeling beauty contest in Prague in 1989, at the age of sixteen. She was a member of Thomas Zeumer's Metropolitan Models.

After arriving in Paris, her popularity increased. Her first important appearance was as the model for the first Wonderbra campaign. In 1994, advertising executive Trevor Beattie, working for TBWA/London, developed an ad for Sara Lee's "Hello Boys" Wonderbra campaign. It featured a close-up image of Herzigová wearing a black Wonderbra. The ad used only two words: "Hello boys." The influential poster was featured in an exhibition at the Victoria and Albert Museum in London and it was voted in at number 10 in a "Poster of the Century" contest. The Canada-based lingerie fashion label wanted the ad campaign to motivate women to see the Wonderbra "as a cosmetic and as a beauty enhancer rather than a functional garment". The billboard was voted in 2011 as the most iconic outdoor ad during the past five decades by the Outdoor Media Centre. She was also featured in Guess? jeans campaigns, the Victoria's Secret catalog and Sports Illustrated. Herzigová has featured in a variety of international fashion magazines, gracing the covers of Vogue (France, Britain, Spain, Germany, Japan, Australia, Mexico, Poland, Turkey, Thailand), Harper's Bazaar (Britain, Spain, Ukraine, Italy, Australia) as well as Elle, Marie Claire, Numéro and Allure. She has also walked for designers including Louis Vuitton, Benedetta Dubini, Giles Deacon, Emilio Pucci and Versace.

Herzigová also starred in a fashion art film by Imagine Fashion, called Decadent Control with Roberto Cavalli. It featured fashions by Agent Provocateur and H&M. Herzigová posed for the August 2004 edition of Playboy. In 2006, she portrayed Venus at the 2006 Winter Olympics Opening Ceremony. In 2013, Herzigová was chosen as the new model for Dior's Capture Totale line. She continued working with Dior into 2021. In 2016, Herzigová was one of those chosen to be spokesmodels for Giorgio Armani's New Normal Campaign.

Personal life
Herzigová married Tico Torres, the drummer from Bon Jovi, in September 1996 in New Jersey. The couple divorced in June 1998. Herzigová has three sons with Italian businessman Gregorio Marsiaj: George (born 1 June 2007), Philipe (born 13 March 2011) and Edward (born 20 April 2013). They live in Italy. In 2017, the couple became engaged.

Filmography

References

External links

 
 

1973 births
Living people
People from Litvínov
Czech female models
Czech film actresses
Czech expatriates in Italy
Italian actresses
Italian female models
The Lions (agency) models